Buffeljags Dam is a gravity/earth-fill type dam on the Buffeljags River, near Swellendam, Western Cape, South Africa. It was established in 1967 and renovated in 1983. Its primary purpose today is for irrigation use.

See also
List of reservoirs and dams in South Africa
List of rivers of South Africa

References 

 List of South African Dams from the Department of Water Affairs

Dams in South Africa
Dams completed in 1967
1967 establishments in South Africa